The Ministry of Labour and Social Economy ( MITES) is the department of the Government of Spain responsible for planning and carrying out the government policy on labour relations and social economy.

The  MITES is headed by the Minister of Labour, a Cabinet member who is appointed by the Monarch at request of the Prime Minister. The Labour Minister is assisted by five high-ranking officials, the Secretary of State for Migration, the Secretary of State for Social Security, the Secretary of State for Employment, the Secretary General for Immigration and Emigration and the Under Secretary of Labour. The current minister is Yolanda Díaz.

History
The idea of creating a Ministry of Labour was manifested by the King Alfonso XIII in the opening of the Cortes of 1914 but the World War I delayed that purpose. The Ministry of Labour was finally created in the government of Eduardo Dato on May 8, 1920. It had previously existed Institute of Social Reforms (1903, heir of the Social Reform Commission, 1883) and the National Institute of Foresight (1908), which were integrated into the new Department. It also obtained the powers of the newly disappeared Ministry of Supply (1918-1920).
It was also included in the structure of the ministry the Bureau of Labour of the Directorate General of Trade, Industry and Labour, the Emigration Council and the Board of Engineers and Pensioners Abroad. The functions of the Labour Inspectorate (1906) were also given to the new ministry.

In the Second Republic, the Minister Francisco Largo Caballero was issued the Decree about Workers Associations, through which these entities passed to the jurisdiction of the Ministry of Labour from the Governation Ministry.

In Francoist Spain the suppression of freedom of association, demonstration and strike as well as collective bargaining, the Ministry, without prejudice to the work of the Vertical Union, expanded its capacity for action, establishing up to the detail of working conditions.

After the Spanish transition to democracy, Social Security competences passed in 1977 to the newly created Ministry of Health, although Labour Ministry recovered them in 1981. In 1978 the National Employment Institute was created. Later, the creation in 1988 of the Ministry of Social Affairs meant the loss of social policies. Nevertheless, both Departments merged in 1996, after the electoral victory of the Popular Party, assigning itself for the first time the organisms Institute of the Woman and Institute of the Youth.

In 2004, with José Luis Rodríguez Zapatero as President of the Government, the Ministry of Labour assumes the immigration powers that until now resided in the Ministry of the Interior. In terms of social policies, in 2008 they were distributed between the Ministry of Education and the newly created Ministry of Equality (Now ministry of Health and Ministry of Equality have been merged).

In the X Legislature, from December 22, 2011, the Ministry is renamed Employment and Social Security, while retaining the same competencies. In the middle of the 12th Cortes Generales, the biggest opposition party, the Spanish Socialist Workers' Party, presented and won a vote of no confidence against the second government of Mariano Rajoy. After this event, Sánchez appointed Magdalena Valerio as the new Labour Minister, and he renamed the Department as Ministry of Labour, Migrations and Social Security.

In 2020, the new Cabinet of Sánchez integrated a new political party, Unidas Podemos, and the Prime Minister appointed Yolanda Díaz as new minister of Labour and Social Economy. The Department lost its responsibility for social security and migration, which meant a reduction of its budget from €52 billion in 2019 to €25 billion in 2020, as well as losing control of more than 150 billion euros of the social security budget.

Structure

This ministry is structured in the following higher bodies:

 The Secretariat of State for Employment and Social Economy
 The Directorate-General for Labour
 The Directorate General for Self-Employment, the Social Economy and Corporate Social Responsibility
The Administrative Unit of the European Social Fund
The Deputy Directorate-General for Programming and Evaluation of the European Social Fund
 The Undersecretariat of the Ministry
 The Technical General Secretariat
The Budget Office
The Administrative Office
The Inspectorate-General of Services
The Deputy Directorate-General for Human Resources
The Deputy Directorate-General for the Regulation and Development of Human Resources of the Agencies and Social Security
The Deputy Directorate-General for Information and Communications Technologies
The Deputy Directorate-General for Financial Administration

Ministry agencies 

 Economic and Social Council
 National System for Employment
 Labour and Social Security Inspectorate
 National Institute for Safety and Health at Work

List of Ministers of Labour

Reign of Alfonso XIII (1902-1923)

Dictatorship of Miguel Primo de Rivera (1923-1931)

Second Spanish Republic (1931-1939)

Dictatorship of Francisco Franco (1936-1975)

Reign of Juan Carlos I (1975-2014)

Reign of Felipe VI (2014-present)

(1) Ministry of Labour and Social Protection (2) Ministry of Labour, Heath and Social Protection  (3) Ministry of Labour, Health and Justice (4) Ministry of Labour and Protection (5) Ministry of Labour and Social Attendance  (6) Ministry of Labour (7) Ministry of Agriculture and Labour (8) Ministry of Labour, Health and Social Security (9) Ministry of Employment and Social Security  (10) Ministry of Labour Social Affairs  (11) Ministry of Labour and Immigration (12) Ministry of Labour, Commerce and Industry(13) Ministry of Trade Union Action and Organization(14) Ministry of Labour, Migrations and Social Security(15) Ministry of Labour and Social Economy

Notes and references

Spanish Cabinets at CSIC website

External links
 Portal Oficial
 "Dirección General of Ciudadanía Exterior" official website
 Portal de los jóvenes españoles en el exterior: CEXT

Labour And Immigration
Spain
Spain, Employment and Social Security
1920 establishments in Spain
Employment